Aspergillus occultus is a species of fungus in the genus Aspergillus. It is from the Circumdati section. The species was first described in 2014. It has been reported to produce ochratoxin A and penicillic acid.

Growth and morphology

A. occultus has been cultivated on both Czapek yeast extract agar (CYA) plates and Malt Extract Agar Oxoid® (MEAOX) plates. The growth morphology of the colonies can be seen in the pictures below.

References

Further reading 
 
 

occultus
Fungi described in 2014